Robert S. McMillan is an astronomer at the University of Arizona, and heads the Spacewatch project, which studies minor planets. He has made various discoveries, including notably 20000 Varuna.

On October 19, 2008, he discovered a short-periodic comet 208P/McMillan.

In 1977 McMillan received his Ph.D. from the University of Texas at Austin.

Footnotes

See also 
 Near-Earth Object Camera
 Pioneer 11
 Spacewatch
 Wide-field Infrared Survey Explorer

External links 
 University of Arizona – Robert S. (Bob) McMillan
 UA Science, Lunar and Planetary Laboratory – Bob McMillan

American astronomers
Discoverers of comets
Planetary scientists
University of Texas at Austin College of Natural Sciences alumni
University of Arizona faculty
Discoverers of trans-Neptunian objects
Living people
Year of birth missing (living people)